Vallée-du-Ntem is a department of South Province in Cameroon. The department covers an area of 7,303 km and as of 2005 had a total population of 79,182. The capital of the department lies at Ambam.

Subdivisions
The department is divided administratively into 4 communes / arrondissements, and in turn into villages.

Communes / Arrondissements 
 Ambam
 Ma'an
 Olamze
 Kyé-Ossi

References

Departments of Cameroon
South Region (Cameroon)